The Treaty of Fort St. Stephens or Treaty of Choctaw Trading House was signed between the United States and the Choctaws at Fort St. Stephens. The treaty was signed at  the Choctaw trading house on October 24, 1816. It ceded  of Choctaw land east of the Tombigbee River. The land was exchanged for 6,000 US dollars annually for twenty years. In 2008 dollars that would be nearly $80,000.

Terms

The preamble begins with,

1. Lands to be ceded. 
2. Pay the Choctaw $6000 US dollars annually for 20 years and $10000 worth of merchandise.

Signatories

John Coffee, John Rhea, John McKee, Mushoolatubbee, Pooshamallaha, Pukshunnubbu, General Terror, Choctaw Eestannokee, General Humming Bird, Talking warrior, David Folsom, Bob Cole, Oofuppa, Hoopoieeskitteenee, Hoopoieemiko, and Hoopoieethoma.

Witness: Tho. H. Williams, secretary to the commission; John Pitchlynn, interpreter; Turner Broshear, interpreter; M. Mackey, interpreter; Silas Dinsmoor; and R. Chamberlin.

See also
List of Choctaw Treaties
Treaty of Hopewell
Treaty of Fort Adams
Treaty of Fort Confederation
Treaty of Hoe Buckintoopa
Treaty of Mount Dexter
Treaty of Doak's Stand
Treaty of Washington City
Treaty of Dancing Rabbit Creek
List of treaties

Citations

External links
Indian Affairs: Laws and Treaties (Treaty with the Choctaw, 1816)
CPI Calculator

Fort St. Stephens
1816 treaties
1816 in the United States